Hybosida lucida is a species of spiders found on Mahe Island in the Seychelles.

References

Spiders described in 1898
Spiders of Africa
Fauna of Seychelles
Palpimanidae